A number of significant scientific events occurred in 2020.

Events

January

February

March

April

May

June

July

August

September

October

 1 October
 Researchers report the discovery of a novel overlapping gene (OLG) (a gene partially overlapping with a sequence of another gene), named ORF3d, in the SARS-CoV-2 genome, that may be a factor in the SARS-CoV-2 pandemic. They found the gene has been identified before, but only in a variant of coronavirus that infects pangolins.
Astronomers announce spectroscopic confirmation of a web-like structure containing galaxies and dark matter around, and likely fueling, a quasar at an age of the Universe of 0.9 bn years, which contributes to an explanation of how such supermassive black holes could have grown rapidly so early.
 2 October – A rippling graphene-based Brownian ratchet-related energy-harvesting circuit with the potential to deliver "clean, limitless, low-voltage power for small devices" if adequately incorporated into a chip is demonstrated.
 5 October
The 2020 Nobel Prize in Medicine is awarded to Harvey J. Alter, Michael Houghton and Charles M. Rice for their work on the hepatitis C virus.
Scientists announce the first global estimate of sea-floor microplastics: 14 million tonnes of microplastic on the ocean floor in terms of overall weight. Their estimate was created by averaging the microplastic mass per cm3, is about double their estimate using earlier data and 1-1.7 times the amount of plastic thought to annually enter the oceans .
 6 October
The 2020 Nobel Prize in Physics is awarded to Roger Penrose, Reinhard Genzel and Andrea Ghez for their work on black holes.
Scientists report the direct visualization of neuronal tissue of extraordinarily well-preserved ≈2,000 years-old human neuronal tissue – whose discovery was reported in January – of a victim of the eruption of Mount Vesuvius in Italy, vitrified by hot ash.

 7 October
The 2020 Nobel Prize in Chemistry is awarded to Emmanuelle Charpentier and Jennifer A. Doudna for their work on genome editing.
Researchers reveal a new high-temperature superconducting cable, named VIPER, capable of sustaining higher levels of electric current and magnetic fields than previously possible.
Researchers demonstrate the first passive radiative device that absorbs heat from the hotter inside of an enclosure and emits it on the outside. The system has potential to cool vehicle and building interiors, and solar cells, without using electricity.
Medical researchers conclude the SARS-CoV-2 can remain on common surfaces for up to 28 days in laboratory conditions that include darkness.
Scientists present a comprehensive quantification of global sources and sinks of the greenhouse gas N2O and report that human-induced emissions increased by 30% over the past four decades and is the main cause of the increase in atmospheric concentrations, with recent growth exceeding some of the highest projected IPCC emission scenarios.
 8 October
In an unprecedented move, all 34 editors of top medical journal, The New England Journal of Medicine, condemn President Trump's handling of the COVID-19 pandemic.
Scientists release the largest and most detailed 3D maps of the Universe, called "PS1-STRM". The data of the MAST was created using neural networks and combines data from the Sloan Digital Sky Survey and others. Users can query the dataset online or download it in its entirety of ≈300GB.
 12 October – Medical scientists report, for the first time in the U.S. and fifth worldwide, confirming evidence of reinfection with the SARS-CoV-2.
 13 October
The red supergiant star Betelgeuse is shown to be 530 light years away, about 25% closer than previously thought. Additionally, its estimated size is revised downwards, from the semi-major axis of Jupiter to around two-thirds of this diameter.
Scientists report in a preprint the possible detection of glycine in the atmosphere of Venus with the ALMA radio telescope. The amino acid may be relevant to the origin of life and was found on meteorites earlier.
On 15 October BepiColombo conducts a fly-by of Venus, having instruments possibly sensitive enough to detect the gas, without a detection or non-detection being declared by 10 November.
A data analysis released as a preprint on 19 October shows no statistical evidence for an apparent detection of phosphine in the atmosphere of Venus reported in September and that "at least a handful of spurious features" which can be obtained with the data processing method that was used in the study.
On 27 October scientists release a preprint according to which the detection via JCMT can be explained by the presence of other gases and the ALMA interferometric data is invalid due to calibration issues of the used data processing scripts. Independent processing of the ALMA data by several teams varied from the original study's authors'. They also claim to have found an inconsistency between the proposed photochemical model and data about the altitude of the gas in the original study.
On the same day, other researchers publish a paper according to which no phosphine was discovered between 2012 and 2015 at the cloud tops and the lower mesosphere above, putting an upper limit of PH3 abundance there.
On 28 October science journalists reported that ESO ALMA scientists found separate, unspecified issues – later reported to be a calibration error that was found as a result of the study "No phosphine in the atmosphere of Venus" – with the data that was used by authors of the study that claimed an apparent detection of phosphine in September, and took those data off the observatory's public archive so that the European ALMA Regional Centre Network, who originally calibrated the data, scrutinises it in detail and reprocesses it.

 14 October
A multicriteria optimization shows restoration of degraded terrestrial ecosystems to be up to 13 times more cost-effective when applied in prioritized locations, with major improvements in terms of biodiversity and climate goals, at low cost. Their estimated cost-benefit ratio is based on contemporary assignments of value for labor, material input, and yield losses – such as of beef – on the costs-side and biodiversity conservation, local nature benefits, poverty-reduction, and climate-stabilization on the benefits-side. They note that gains are highest when restoration is combined with protection of remaining ecosystems.
Report that a high pressure room-temperature superconductor able to work at 15 °C is demonstrated by the University of Rochester. Although requiring 260 GPa (2.6 million times the atmospheric pressure), this new compound of hydrogen, carbon and sulfur is a 35 °C improvement on the previous record. In 2022 the article was retracted by Nature journal editorial board due to a non standard, user-defined data analysis calling into question the scientific validity of the claim.  
A study reports major shifts in the colony size structure – the demographics – of the Great Barrier Reef's coral populations compared to 1995/1996. The reef is known to have lost more than half of its overall coral cover since then.
Researchers report that antibiotic resistance genes can spread into bacterial populations without the respective selection pressure via horizontal gene transfer.
Scientists report, based on near-real-time activity data, an 'unprecedented' abrupt 8.8% decrease in global CO2 emissions in the first half of 2020 compared to the same period in 2019, larger than during previous economic downturns and World War II. Authors note that such decreases of human activities "cannot be the answer" and that structural and transformational changes in human economic management and behaviour systems are needed.

 15 October
A preliminary report by the WHO's Solidarity trial concludes that its four tested, repurposed, treatments "appeared to have little or no effect on hospitalized COVID-19, as indicated by overall mortality, initiation of ventilation and duration of hospital stay".
 NASA scientists announce the discovery of small amounts of unprotonated cyclopropenylidene – a possible precursor to more complex astrobiological compounds – in the atmosphere of Saturn's moon Titan via ALMA.
 Researchers report that two Homo species lost more than half of their climate niche space just before extinction and that climate change played a substantial role in extinctions of past Homo species.
 16 October – The shortest timespan ever is measured via photoionization: ≈247 zeptoseconds, during which a particle interaction occurs – a photon traveling through a hydrogen molecule.
 19 October
Scientists reconstruct the mechanisms, integrating them in a biogeochemical model, that led to the largest known extinction event, the Permian–Triassic extinction event 252 Mya, and report that it can be traced back to volcanic CO2 emissions.
Researchers report that polypropylene infant feeding bottles with contemporary preparation procedures were found to cause microplastics exposure to infants ranging from 14,600 to 4,550,000 particles per capita per day in 48 regions. Microplastics release is higher with warmer liquids and similar with other polypropylene products such as lunchboxes.

 20 October – NASA's OSIRIS-REx spacecraft briefly touches down on Bennu, becoming the agency's first probe to retrieve samples from an asteroid, with its cargo due for return to Earth in 2023.
 21 October – Scientists analyze the all-cause mortality effect of the first wave of the COVID-19 pandemic for 21 industrialized countries – including its timing, demographics and excess deaths per capita – and assess determinants for substantial death rate variations such as the countries' pandemic preparedness and management.

 23 October – Scientists illustrate that and how quantum clocks could experience a possibly experimentally testable superposition of proper times via time dilation of Einstein's theory of relativity by which time passes slower for one object in relation to another object when the former moves at a higher velocity. In "quantum time dilation" one of the two clocks moves in a superposition of two localized momentum wave packets, resulting in a change to the classical time dilation.

 26 October
Astronomers report detecting molecular water on the sunlit surface of the Moon outside of the lunar south pole by data from three independent spacecraft and the SOFIA.
Astronomers confirm, based on new observations, Yarkovsky acceleration of asteroid Apophis, which is relevant to asteroid impact avoidance as the asteroid is currently thought to have a very small chance of Earth impact in 2068.
27 October – The largest clinical trial – aiming to recruit over 5,000 participants – to investigate effects of Vitamin D supplementation – including with a dosage regime near the RDI – on risk and/or severity of COVID-19 and other acute respiratory infections, CORONAVIT, is launched. Another such trial's proposal was published in a journal on 10 October and is reported aiming to recruit 2,700 people across the United States.

 28 October
Scientists report finding a coral reef measuring 500 m in height, located at the northern tip of Australia's Great Barrier Reef, the first discovery of its kind in 120 years.
Scientists publish estimates of the occurrence rates of rocky habitable zone planets around Sun-like stars with updated data and criteria for habitable zones – including ≈4 such exoplanets around G and K dwarf stars within 10 pc of the Sun and ≈300 million in the Milky Way.
Scientists report in a preprint that a variant of SARS-CoV-2, 20A.EU1, was first observed in Spain in early summer and has become the most frequent variant in multiple European countries. They also illustrate the emergence and spread of other frequent clusters of sequences using Nextstrain.
A systematic, and possibly first large-scale, cross-sectoral analysis of water, energy and land in security in 189 countries that links national and sector consumption to sources shows that countries and sectors are highly exposed to over-exploited, insecure, and degraded such resources with economic globalization having decreased security of global supply chains. The study finds that most countries exhibit greater exposure to resource risks via international trade – mainly from remote production sources – and that diversifying trading partners is unlikely to help countries and sectors to reduce these or to improve their resource self-sufficiency.

 29 October – Scientists assess four preparation procedures of rice for their capacity to reduce arsenic content and preserve nutrients, recommending a procedure involving parboiling and water-absorption.
 31 October – Slovakia starts implementation of a short-period mass-testing programme to test two-thirds of its citizens for COVID-19.

November

1 November – Scientists report that Sahelanthropus tchadensis, presumed to be an extinct hominin earlier, is not a hominin after all.
3 November – A Danish state-owned independent research institute reports the discovery of mutated variants of SARS-CoV-2 that humans can be infected by and could have dangerous effects, called "Cluster 5", in the mink population in the country's mink industry. A day afterwards officials of the nation announce that minks would be culled in order to prevent possible spread of this mutation and reduce the risk of new mutations happening. Lockdown and travel restrictions were implemented on 6 November. On 19 November SSI announced that cluster 5 in all probability had become extinct.

4 November
Astronomers determine that magnetars are a prime source of fast radio bursts (FRBs).
Scientists announce the discovery of Kylinxia, a five-eyed ≈5 cm long shrimp-like animal living ~520 Mya that appears to be a key 'missing link' of the evolution from Anomalocaris to arthropods and could be at the evolutionary root of arthropods.
Further evidence – based on paired coronene-mercury spikes – for a volcanic combustion cause of the largest known mass extinction of life 252 Mya is published.
6 November
Astrophysicists report the first X-ray emissions measurement of baryonic matter of cosmic web filaments, strengthening empirical support for a recent solution to the missing baryon problem of missing detections of ≈40% of ordinary matter.
Researchers report the development of superconducting Bose-Einstein condensate.
Scientists report that reducing emissions from the global food system is critical to achieving the Paris Agreement's climate goals.
Scientists begin collecting living fragments, tissue and DNA samples of corals from the Great Barrier Reef for a biobank for potential future restoration and rehabilitation activities.
9 November – The first successful phase III trial of a possible COVID-19 vaccine, BNT162b2, is announced by drug companies Pfizer and BioNTech, Pfizer claims a reduction of infections by "over 90%", specified to be 95% later.
10 November
Scientists show why concentrations of radionuclides in rocky planet mantles may be critical for the habitability of Earth-like planets as such planets with higher abundances likely lack a persistent dynamo for a significant fraction of their lifetimes and those with lower abundances may often be geologically inert. Planetary dynamos create strong magnetic fields which may often be necessary for life to develop or persist and radionuclides are thought to be produced by rare stellar processes such as neutron star mergers.
Scientists show, with an experiment with different gravity environments on the ISS, that microorganisms could be employed to mine useful elements from basalt rocks via bioleaching in space.
A scientist releases visualizations that show why face masks meant to slow the spread of COVID-19 should not have valves under a free license.

11 November
Astronomers report newly found evidence for volcanic activity as recently as 53–210 kya on the planet Mars. Such activity could have provided the environment, in terms of energy and chemicals, needed to support life forms.
Scientists report the detection of SARS-CoV-2 receptor-binding domain antibodies in 111 (11.6%) of 959 asymptomatic individuals of a lung cancer screening trial in Italy, starting from 3 September 2019, apparently establishing a substantially earlier start time of the COVID-19 pandemic. However, the journal published an expression of concern in March 2021 due to possible issues with the peer review.
12 November – Scientists report the development of a microalgae-based fish-free aquaculture feed with substantial gains in sustainability, performance, economic viability, and human health.
13 November – Scientists report that Mars' current loss of atomic hydrogen from water is largely driven by seasonal processes and dust storms that transport water directly to the upper atmosphere and that this has influenced the planet's climate.
16 November
Results of phase III trials of Moderna's mRNA vaccine are announced, the company claims to 94.5% reduction of COVID-19 cases based on interim results, including severe illnesses. The vaccine is easier to distribute than BNT162b2 as no ultra-cold storage is required.
ALMA staff release a corrected version of the data used by other scientists in a study published on 14 September that claimed an apparent detection of phosphine in Venus' atmosphere. On the same day authors of this study publish a re-analysis as a preprint using the new data that concludes the planet-averaged PH3 abundance to be ≈7 times lower than what they detected with data of the previous ALMA processing, to vary by location and to be reconcilable with the JCMT detection of ≈20 times this abundance if substantially varying in time. They also respond to points raised in a preprint that challenged their conclusions in October and find that so far no other compound can explain the data. ALMA is reported to be expected to restart in early 2021 after a shutdown due to the COVID-19 crisis and may enable further observations that could provide insights for the ongoing investigation.
18 November – Researchers report that CRISPR/Cas9, using a lipid nanoparticle delivery system, has been used to treat cancer effectively in a living animal for the first time.
21 November – Sentinel-6 Michael Freilich is launched into orbit, to monitor sea levels in higher detail than ever before. The satellite's resolution will allow measuring of water depths closer to the shore, which has long been an area of uncertainty.
23 November 
Medical researchers report that during human-to-human transmission, an average of about 1000 infectious SARS-CoV-2 virions is thought to initiate a new infection.
Preliminary test results for AstraZeneca's AZD1222 vaccine, developed in collaboration with Oxford University are released. The company claims 70% efficacy in the overall study, and 90% in a subsample where the first dose was reduced by accident.
A small randomized controlled trial suggests that an additional increase in plant-based, protein-rich foods alongside additional restriction of meat intake can amplify the known beneficial effects of the Mediterranean diet.

24 November
A study shows that bottlenose dolphins can learn – apparently via instrumental conditioning – to rapidly and selectively slow down their heart rate during diving for conserving oxygen depending on external signals. In humans regulating heart rate by methods such as listening to music, meditation or a vagal maneuver takes longer and only lowers the rate to a much smaller extent.
A scientific review summarizes current scientific knowledge about optimal design of face mask products with goals such as thermal comfort and suppression of COVID-19 spread as indicated by fluid flow dynamics, and about the efficacy of their use for the prevention of COVID-19 spread.
Neuroscientists report that a small randomized double-blind within-subject study of healthy young adults shows that dietary flavanols from cocoa powder can improve brain oxygenation at suboptimal baseline cerebrovascular reactivity to CO2 and – when cognitive demand is high – cognitive performance.
25 November
The Borexino collaboration reports the detection of Solar neutrinos produced by the carbon–nitrogen–oxygen cycle, confirming prior predictions about a mechanism – dominant in stars heavier than the Sun – that fuses hydrogen into helium.
Scientists report the development of micro-droplets for algal cells or synergistic algal-bacterial multicellular spheroid microbial reactors capable of producing oxygen as well as hydrogen via photosynthesis in daylight under air, which may be useful as a hydrogen economy biotechnology.

29 November – A team of international scientists create a study which suggests that the primeval atmosphere of the early Earth was much different than the conditions used in the Miller-Urey studies considering the origin of life on Earth and more similar to the current atmosphere of Venus.
30 November – DeepMind, an artificial intelligence company, demonstrates a new deep learning-based approach for protein folding, one of the biggest problems in biology, achieving a high protein structure prediction accuracy in tests of the biennial CASP assessment with AlphaFold 2.

December

1 December
The Arecibo telescope collapses after several hurricanes, storms, and earthquakes over the 2010s raised concerns over the stability of the Arecibo observatory and two cable breaks in August and November led teams of engineers to assess a high risk of collapse. One of the three teams determined there to be no safe way to repair the damage due to which the NSF announced the decision for a controlled decommissioning of the telescope on November 19, a few days before the collapse, which was challenged by scientists worldwide who, with a public petition subsequent to this announcement, asked for it to be repaired instead. The telescope built in 1963 was Earth's largest single-aperture telescope until 2016 and the source technology for many significant scientific discoveries, SETI as well as of the 1974 Arecibo message.
The Chinese experimental nuclear fusion reactor HL-2M is turned on for the first time, achieving its first plasma discharge.

2 December
The World Meteorological Organization reports that 2020 is likely among the three warmest years on record globally, at 1.2 °C above the pre-industrial level. The ten years from 2011 to 2020 are also reported to be the warmest decade on record.
Scientists report finding microplastics in the placentas of women with unborn babies for the first time. These may have negative effects on the fetal development.
The world's first regulatory approval for a cultivated meat product is awarded by the Government of Singapore. The chicken meat was grown in a bioreactor in a fluid of amino acids, sugar, and salt. The chicken nuggets food products are ≈70% lab-grown meat, while the remainder is made from mung bean proteins and other ingredients. The company pledged to strive for price parity with premium "restaurant" chicken servings.
Scientists confirm 2020 SO to be rocket booster space junk.
3 December
Chinese researchers claim to have achieved quantum supremacy, using a photonic up to 76-qubit system known as Jiuzhang, which performed calculations at 100 trillion times the speed of classical supercomputers.
Scientists report that repurposed Molnupiravir can completely suppress SARS-CoV-2 transmission within 24 hours in ferrets whose COVID-19 transmission they find to closely resemble SARS-CoV-2 spread in human young adult populations.

8 December
Samples preserved for an estimated 4.6 bn years collected from asteroid 162173 Ryugu with the Japanese spacecraft Hayabusa2 are retrieved on Earth. The capsule containing the two samples becomes the second retrieved pristine asteroid sample a decade after Hayabusa collected the first and includes sub-surface dust. It was sent off from 220 million km away with the spacecraft proceeding on a 2026 and 2031 route to two asteroids.

9 December
The Washington Post reports a serious warning for people with a "significant" history of allergies and the possibility of "anaphylactoid reactions" regarding the Pfizer COVID-19 vaccine.
Scientists report the detection of large-scale X-ray bubbles in the Milky Way halo.
A study finds there to be no direct causal relationship between the proportionally most comparable mass radiations and extinctions, substantially challenging the hypothesis of such creative mass extinctions.
10 December
A proof of concept study – published as a preprint and sent to a journal in June – indicates that sniffer dogs are highly effective in detecting the presence of SARS-CoV-2 in samples of human sweat with two colon-cancer trained dogs achieving success rates of 100% in their 68 tests. Research projects on dogs in COVID-19 screening were reported as early as July and also indicated potential efficacy. At least one trial with publication of results scheduled for early 2021 is ongoing.
Scientists report that four months old ravens can have physical and social cognitive skills similar to that of adult great apes in tests.

11 December
Astronomers report that orbital motion for HD 106906 b was detected. This may be useful for attempts to predict the semi-major axis of the hypothetical Solar System object called Planet Nine.
A human thymus rebuilt using stem cells and a bioengineered scaffold is demonstrated.
A supercomputer simulation of planetary climate feedbacks vaguely suggests that chance – in terms of likeliness after known initial conditions – played a substantial role in Earth's thermal habitability lasting over 3 bn years.
The first whole-genome comparison between chimpanzees and bonobos is published and shows genomic aspects that may underlie or have resulted from their divergence and behavioral differences, including selection for genes related to diet and hormones.

14 December
Authorities of the United Kingdom report the detection and analysis of SARS-CoV-2 variant of Concern 202012/01 with an apparent increased transmissibility to the WHO.
On 18 December South African officials announce the detection of the 501.V2 variant with an apparent increased transmissibility.
These two variants of SARS-CoV-2 are reported to have spread worldwide as of December 30.
On 23 December Malaysian officials announce the detection of similar variant 'A701B' (A701V).
On 24 December African Union officials announce the detection of non-similar variant B.1.1.207 in Nigeria without a confirmed association with increased transmission of the virus in the country at the time.
15 December – An analysis of external climate costs of foods indicates that external greenhouse gas costs are typically highest for animal-based products – conventional and organic to about the same extent within that ecosystem subdomain – followed by conventional dairy products and lowest for organic plant-based foods and concludes contemporary monetary evaluations to be "inadequate" and policy-making that lead to reductions of these costs to be possible, appropriate and urgent.

16 December
For the first time, astronomers may have detected radio emissions from a planet beyond the Solar System. According to the researchers: "The signal is from the Tau Boötes system, which contains a binary star and an exoplanet. We make the case for an emission by the planet itself." Radio wave emissions may become a new way for examining exoplanets.
The Chinese Chang'e 5 spacecraft return a lunar sample, which marks the first lunar sample-return mission conducted since 1976. The Orbiter proceeded on a mission to carry out observations at Sun-Earth Lagrange point L1 after dropping the sample off to Earth.

18 December
Media outlets report that astronomers detected a radio signal, BLC1 (Breakthrough Listen Candidate 1), apparently coming from the direction of Proxima Centauri, the closest star to the Sun. Astronomers have stated that this and other, yet unpublished, signals, "are likely interference that we cannot fully explain" and that it could be the strongest candidate for an extraterrestrial radio signal since the "Wow! signal" of 1977.
A paper by other astronomers released 10 days before the news report about BLC1 reports the detection of "a bright, long-duration optical flare, accompanied by a series of intense, coherent radio bursts" from Proxima Centauri also in April and May 2019. Their finding has not been put in direct relation to the BLC1 signal by scientists or media outlets so far but implies that planets around Proxima Centauri and other red dwarfs are likely to be rather uninhabitable for humans and other currently known organisms.
Ecologists report that the driest and warmest sites of 32 tracked Brazilian non-Amazon tropical forests have moved from carbon sinks to carbon sources overall 2013.
Researchers report a deep learning approach to identify gene regulation at the single-cell level, which previously had been limited to tissue-level analysis.
21 December
Jupiter and Saturn come within a 6' arc (called a great conjunction), giving a rare telescopic view of the two so close together. As the two planets have an apparent size smaller than one arc minute, occultations are extremely rare: this is the closest approach since 1623 and the next occultation will happen in the year 7541.
Publication of research of "counterfactual quantum communication" – whose first achievement was reported in 2017 – by which information can be exchanged without any physical particle traveling between observers and without quantum teleportation. The research suggests that this is based on some form of relation between the properties of modular angular momentum.
Researchers publish projections and models of potential impacts of policy-dependent modulation of how, where, and what food is produced.
22 December
More than 109,000 new craters are identified in the low- and mid-latitude regions of the Moon using artificial intelligence.
A new mineral, dark green in colour and named kernowite, is discovered in Cornwall, South West England.
23 December – A study finds that face masks reduce the risk of spreading large COVID-19-linked droplets when speaking or coughing by up to 99.9 percent.
30 December – Scientists report finding microvascular blood vessel damage in tissue samples of brains without any detected SARS-CoV-2 as well as olfactory bulbs from patients who died from COVID-19.
31 December – Scientists determine that desalination membranes are inconsistent in density and mass distribution, and show a way to increase efficiency in the membranes by up to 40%.

Awards

 Nobel Prize in Physiology or Medicine – Harvey J. Alter, Michael Houghton and Charles M. Rice for the discovery of the hepatitis C virus
 Nobel Prize in Physics – Roger Penrose (1/2) for the discovery that black hole formation is a robust prediction of the general theory of relativityReinhard Genzel (1/4) and Andrea Ghez (1/4) for the discovery of a supermassive compact object at the centre of our galaxy
 Nobel Prize in Chemistry – Emmanuelle Charpentier and Jennifer A. Doudna for the development of a method for genome editing
 20 December – VinGroup announced the launch of the global VinFuture Prize for authors of breakthrough research or technology inventions that have been shown to make people's lives better and improve a sustainable living environment.

Deaths

2 October Victor Zalgaller, Russian and Israeli mathematician (b. 1920)
4 October Louis Fortier, Canadian biologist and oceanographer (b. 1953)
5 October
Dirk Bootsma, Dutch geneticist (b. 1936)
Joshua N. Goldberg, American physicist (b. 1925)
6 October Arthur P. Shimamura, American psychologist (b. 1954)
7 October
Mario Molina, Mexican chemist (b. 1943)
Peter Sleight, British cardiologist (b. 1929)
10 October
Amnon Freidberg, Israeli entomologist (b. 1945)
Dolores Cooper Shockley, American pharmacologist (b. 1930)
11 October
Ilya Moiseev, Russian chemist (b. 1929)
Michael D. Morley, American mathematician (b. 1930)
12 October Sadegh Malek Shahmirzadi, Iranian archeologist and anthropologist (b. 1940)
14 October
Audrey Smedley, American anthropologist (b. 1930)
Joyce Wallace, American physician and AIDS researcher (b. 1940)
17 October Zhang Lina, Chinese physical chemist (b. 1940)
18 October Robert Coleman, American geologist (b. 1923)
19 October Val Curtis, British scientist (b. 1958)
20 October
Yuri Mochanov, Russian archeologist (b. 1934)
Carl E. Thoresen, American psychologist (b. 1933)
21 October J. Michael Lane, American epidemiologist (b. 1936)
24 October Betty Ida Roots, British and Canadian zoologist (b. 1927)
26 October
Chris Abell, British biological chemist (b. 1957)
Albert Medwin, American electrical engineer (b. 1925)
28 October
Anthony van den Pol, American neurosurgeon (b. 1949)
Wen Fubo, Chinese engineer (b. 1925)
29 October
Valentin Pokrovsky, Russian epidemiologist (b. 1929)
Watt W. Webb, American biophysicist (b. 1927)
30 October Chen Haozhu, Chinese cardiologist (b. 1924)
31 October Rudolf Zahradník, Czech chemist (b. 1928)
4 November Moncef Ouannes, Tunisian sociologist (b. 1956)
5 November
Jacques Glowinski, French biologist (b. 1936)
Janine Puget, Argentianian psychiatrist (b. 1926)
Gordon Van Wylen, American physicist (b. 1920)
7 November
Hou Feng, Chinese engineer
Anatoly Mikhailovich Stepin, Russian mathematician
11 November Robert Lue, American biologist (b. 1964)
12 November Masatoshi Koshiba, Japanese physicist and Nobel laureate (b. 1926)
13 November
Robert Byron Bird, American chemical engineer (b. 1924)
Noah Hershkowitz, American physicist (b. 1941)
14 November Peter Pagé, German computer scientist (b. 1939)
15 November
Rudolf Kippenhahn, German astrophysicist (b. 1926)
Anne Rasa, British ethologist (b. 1940)
17 November William A. Clemens Jr., American paleontologist (b. 1932)
19 November
Roger J. Phillips, American geophysicist (b. 1940)
Gennady Zdanovich, Russian archeologist (b. 1938)
20 November Antonio Ambrosetti, Italian mathematician (b. 1944)
22 November Otto Hutter, British physiologist (b. 1924)
23 November Konrad Fiałkowski, Polish engineer (b. 1939)
24 November Erik Galimov, Russian geochemist (b. 1936)
27 November Jin Zhanpeng, Chinese chemist (b. 1938)
29 November Vladimir Fortov, Russian physicist (b. 1946)
30 November Herman van Bekkum, Dutch organic chemist (b. 1932)
1 December
Norman Abramson, American engineer and computer scientist (b. 1932)
Li Guanxing, Chinese nuclear materials engineer (b. 1940)
4 December
Narinder Singh Kapany, Indian and American physicist (b. 1926)
Anatoly Samoilenko, Ukrainian mathematician (b. 1938)
7 December Akito Arima, Japanese nuclear physicist (b. 1930)
9 December Brian H. Murdoch, Irish mathematician (b. 1930)
10 December Bryan Sykes, British geneticist (b. 1947)
11 December Lev Shcheglov, Russian sexologist (b. 1946)
13 December Leith Mullings, American anthropologist (b. 1945)
14 December 
Claudio Baiocchi, Italian mathematician (b. 1940)
Benjamin Abeles, Austrian and Czech physicist (b. 1925)
Michael F. Land, British neurobiologist (b. 1942)
15 December Feng Duan, Chinese physicist (b. 1923)
16 December Wacław Szybalski, Polish and American oncologist (b. 1921)
21 December Arnold Wolfendale, British astronomer (b. 1927)
22 December Edmund M. Clarke, American computer scientist (b. 1945)
24 December Tho. Paramasivan, Indian anthropologist (b. 1950)
26 December Cirilo Nelson, Honduran botanist (b. 1938)
28 December Zou Deci, Chinese engineer (b. 1934)
30 December Alexander Spirin, Russian biochemist (b. 1931)

See also

 :Category:Science events
 :Category:Science timelines
 Impact of the COVID-19 pandemic on science and technology
 COVID-19 apps
 COVID-19 vaccine
 Face masks during the COVID-19 pandemic
 Open-source ventilator#COVID-19 pandemic
 List of technologies
 List of emerging technologies
 List of years in science

References

External links
 
 Science Summary 2020, monthly images for entries of this list

 
 
2020-related lists
21st century in science
Science
Science timelines by year

de:2020 in der Wissenschaft und Technik